Pascal Lamour (born 28 October 1958 in Theix, Morbihan) is a French Breton musician. After a long career as an herbalist, he devoted himself entirely to music since 2000. He has produced thirteen albums under his own label, BNC, since 1994, but has actually made known in the music business since 2005-2006. He has played throughout Europe, and in Quebec, the United States, Brazil, Vietnam and other countries.

He mixes traditional Breton music with electronic rhythms. In 2010, he wrote a book illustrated by Bruno Brucero.

References 

Breton musicians
Celtic folk musicians
1958 births
People from Morbihan
Living people
Breton-language singers